Elliott Edmondson (born 29 August 1994) is a British rally co-driver. Currently, he is the co-driver of Oliver Solberg for Hyundai Motorsport in the World Rally Championship.

Rally results

* Season still in progress.

References

External links

 Elliott Edmondson's e-wrc profile

1994 births
Living people
British rally co-drivers
World Rally Championship co-drivers